The Tamil Nadu Council of Ministers is the executive wing of the Government of Tamil Nadu and headed by the State's Chief Minister M. K. Stalin who is the head of government and leader of the state cabinet. The current state council of ministers to be sworn in on 7 May 2021, after 2021 Tamil Nadu Legislative Assembly election. The term of every executive wing is for 5 years. The council of ministers are assisted by department secretaries attached to each ministry who are from IAS Tamil Nadu cadre. The chief executive officer responsible for issuing orders on behalf of Government is Chief Secretary to the State Government. The current Chief Secretary is V. Irai Anbu IAS

Constitutional requirement

For the Council of Ministers to aid and advise Governor 
According to Article 163 of the Indian Constitution,

This means that the Ministers serve under the pleasure of the Governor and he/she may remove them, on the advice of the Chief Minister, whenever they want.

The Chief Minister shall be appointed by the Governor and the other Ministers shall be appointed by the Governor on the advice of the Chief Minister, and the Minister shall hold office during the pleasure of the Governor:Provided that in the States of Bihar, Madhya Pradesh and Orissa, there shall be a Minister in charge of tribal welfare who may in addition be in charge of the welfare of the Scheduled Castes and backward classes or any other work.

Chief Minister 

Like any Indian state, Chief Minister of Tamil Nadu is the real head of the government and responsible for state administration. He is the leader of the parliamentary party in the legislature and heads the state cabinet.

Deputy Chief Minister 

Like any state, Deputy Chief Minister of Tamil Nadu is the deputy head of the government and senior minister of cabinet after the Chief Minister and mostly the position was vacant.

State Cabinet 

As per Indian Constitution, all portfolios of state government is vested in Chief Minister, who distribute various portfolio to individual ministers whom he nominates to the State Governor. The state governor appoints individual ministers for various portfolios and departments as per advice of Chief Minister and together form the State Cabinet. As the original portfolios are vested with CM, who delegates to others upon his/her wish, actions of individual ministers are part of collective responsibility of the state cabinet and Chief Minister is responsible for actions of each minister. The state cabinet along with Chief Minister, prepares General policy and individual department policy, which will be guiding policy for day-to-day administration of each minister.

Past Ministries of Tamil Nadu Government

See also 
 Government of Tamil Nadu
 Legislature of Tamil Nadu
 Chief Ministers of Tamil Nadu
 List of Tamil Nadu governmental organisations
 Tamil Nadu Government's Departments
 Government of India
 Cabinet of India
 List of Female Ministers in Tamil Nadu

References

External links 
 http://www.tn.gov.in/ministerslist
 Tamil Nadu ministers list 2017

Government of Tamil Nadu
State council of ministers of India